Hieromantis is a genus of moths in the Stathmopodidae family .

Species
Hieromantis albata (Meyrick, 1913)
Hieromantis amblyptera  Meyrick, 1927
Hieromantis ancylogramma  Meyrick, 1933
Hieromantis arcuata Guan & Li, 2015
Hieromantis chrysoleuca  Meyrick, 1913
Hieromantis deprivata  Meyrick, 1927
Hieromantis ephodophora  Meyrick, 1897
Hieromantis fibulata  Meyrick, 1906
Hieromantis inhonorata  Meyrick, 1927
Hieromantis ioxysta  Meyrick, 1913
Hieromantis kurokoi  Yasuda, 1988
Hieromantis makiosana  Yasuda, 1988
Hieromantis munerata  Meyrick, 1924
Hieromantis phaedora  Meyrick, 1929
Hieromantis praemiata  Meyrick, 1922
Hieromantis puerensis Guan & Li, 2015
Hieromantis rectangula Guan & Li, 2015
Hieromantis resplendens  Bradley, 1957
Hieromantis sheni Li & Wang, 2002
Hieromantis tribolopa  Meyrick, 1924

References

 
Stathmopodidae
Moth genera